Shivering Spines is a pop band from Jönköping, Sweden, who were active from 1988 to 1993

The band won the PolyGram competition "Rockband of the year-90", and released a single on this label.

The discussions with PolyGram seemed endless, so finally the band decided to release the album on a local label. It showed to be a good move. Their debut CD, Garlic Escargots, gave Shivering Spines much publicity. Many songs from the CD were played several times on the Swedish national radio. The CD also received good reviews in music magazines such as Pop, Sound Affects and Backstage. The video Lying Awake has been shown on the MTV-show 120 Minutes and on Swedish national television.

Shivering Spines has during the years played at pubs and smaller clubs from northern to southern Sweden. They have also appeared on festivals such as Dalarock-90 (about Dalarock), Hultsfredsfestivalen-91, Hultsfredsfestivalen-93 (about Hultsfredsfestivalen) in Sweden and Påskfestivalen-93 (Easter Festival) in Copenhagen.

Discography 

Desert Hum / Power
(7", Tilt Records, Spines 001, -89)

Judas Kiss / Pros and Cons of Convertible Homes
(7", Tilt Records, Spines 002, -90)

Live Kulturhuset 14 sept-91
(MC, Tilt Records, Spines 003, -91)

Heaven is.../ The Night Before Today
(7"/CD, PolyGram, 866750-7, -92)

Garlic Escargots
(CD, Brimstone Production, BRCD 9301, -93)

Videos 

Heaven is...
(from CD-single Heaven is.../ The Night Before Today, PolyGram -92)

December Live
(live from Kåren in Jönköping, Brimstone Prod. BRVD 9212, -92)

Lying Awake
(from CD Garlic Escargots, Brimstone Production, BRVD 9306, -93)

Swedish musical groups